Kosmos 314 ( meaning Cosmos 314), known before launch as DS-P1-Yu No.30, was a Soviet satellite which was launched in 1969 as part of the Dnepropetrovsk Sputnik programme. It was a  spacecraft, which was built by the Yuzhnoye Design Bureau, and was used as a radar calibration target for anti-ballistic missile tests.

Launch 
Kosmos 314 was launched from Site 133/1 at the Plesetsk Cosmodrome, atop a Kosmos-2I 63SM carrier rocket. The launch occurred on 11 December 1969 at 12:58:59 UTC, and resulted in the successful deployment of Kosmos 314 into low Earth orbit. Upon reaching orbit, it was assigned its Kosmos designation, and received the International Designator 1969-106A.

It remained in orbit until it decayed and reentered the atmosphere on 22 March 1970. It was the twenty-eighth of seventy nine DS-P1-Yu satellites to be launched, and the twenty-sixth of seventy two to successfully reach orbit.

See also

 1969 in spaceflight

References

Spacecraft launched in 1969
Kosmos satellites
Dnepropetrovsk Sputnik program